Solution by Phone is a 1954 British crime film directed by Alfred Travers and starring Clifford Evans, Thea Gregory and Georgina Cookson. The screenplay concerns an actor who seeks help from a crime novelist in his attempts to dispose of a body. It was a second feature, shot at Brighton Studios with sets designed by the art director Don Russell.

Cast
 Clifford Evans as Richard Hanborough
 Thea Gregory as Ann Selby
 John Witty as  Peter Wayne
 Georgina Cookson as Frances Hanborough
 Enid Hewitt as Mrs. Garner
 Geoffrey Goodheart as Inspector Kirby
 Max Brimmell as Sgt. Woods

References

Bibliography
 Chibnall, Steve & McFarlane, Brian. The British 'B' Film. Palgrave MacMillan, 2009.

External links

1954 films
1954 crime films
Films directed by Alfred Travers
British crime films
British black-and-white films
1950s English-language films
1950s British films